Baptist Noel may refer to:

Baptist Noel (MP) (1658–1690), Member of Parliament for Rutland
Baptist Noel, 3rd Earl of Gainsborough (1684–1714)
Baptist Noel, 4th Earl of Gainsborough (1708–1751)
Baptist Noel, 5th Earl of Gainsborough (1740–1759)
Baptist Wriothesley Noel (1799–1873), English evangelical clergyman of aristocratic family
Baptist Noel, 3rd Viscount Campden

See also
Earl of Gainsborough
John Baptist Lucius Noel, mountaineer and filmmaker